Theater am Olgaeck  is a theatre in Baden-Württemberg, Germany.

References

Theatres in Stuttgart